Oxford BioLabs is a UK based company focusing on the research and development of novel health & beauty therapies. It has received media attention for its hair growth product TRX2.

History & Structure
Oxford BioLabs was founded in August 2008 as a Limited Liability Company in England and Wales by former scientists of the University of Oxford, including biochemist and entrepreneur Thomas Whitfield. The company have German based Research Facilities located in Biopark Regensburg, Regensburg, Germany. According to an article published by The Daily Telegraph the company is bootstrapped by its founders as well as by NESTA and the National Council for Graduate Entrepreneurship (NCGE).

The company manufactures and distributes a dietary supplement called TRX2 (from Greek trichos for hair and 2 for second generation) which it claimed reduced hair loss - see below for controversy. The product works by engaging potassium channels, which allows them to reabsorb essential nutrients. The product is a dietary supplement, not exactly a drug, and hence it doesn't need to be approved by the U.S. Food and Drug Administration (FDA).

Controversy
In January 2014 the UK Advertising Standards Authority upheld a complaint against TRX2 and Oxford Biolabs, citing that advertisements that the company had run for TRX2 were misleading and in breach of EU advertising codes. The company agreed and changed their advertising in line with the code of conduct.

See also
 Thomas Whitfield (entrepreneur)

References

External links
 Official Website
 Website on the product TRX2
 Baldness Cure in Sight cherwell.org
 Oxford Student Working To Combat Baldness
 Oxford University press release

British companies established in 2008
Health care companies of the United Kingdom
Health care companies established in 2008